The Roman Catholic Diocese of Mbujimayi is a Latin diocese in the Democratic Republic of the Congo's Kasai Oriental province. 
It is a suffragan in the Ecclesiastical province of  Kananga.

Its cathedral episcopal see is the Cathédrale Saint-Jean-Baptiste de Bonzola in the city of Mbuji-Mayi.

History 
 Established on 22 November 1963.11.22 as Apostolic Administration of Mbuji-Mayi, on territories split off from the Metropolitan Archdiocese of Luluabourg and the Diocese of Kabinda
 May 3, 1966: Promoted as Diocese of Mbujimayi

Bishops 
(all Latin Rite)

Ordinaries
 Apostolic administrator 
 Joseph Ngogi Nkongolo (1966.05.03 – 1991 see below), previously Titular Bishop of Lebedus & Apostolic Vicar of Luebo (Congo-Kinshasa) (1959.04.25 – 1959.11.10), promoted first Bishop of Luebo (Congo-Kinshasa) (1959.11.10 – 1966.05.03)

 Suffragan Bishops of Mbujimayi 
 Joseph Ngogi Nkongolo (see above 1966.05.03 – 1991)
 Tharcisse Tshibangu Tshishiku (1991.11.26 - emeritate 2009.08.01), previously Titular Bishop of Scampa & Auxiliary Bishop of Kinshasa (Congo-Kinshasa) (1970.09.01 – 1991.11.26)
 Bernard Emmanuel Kasanda Mulenga (2009.08.01 – ...), previously Titular Bishop of Utimmira (1998.02.14 – 2009.08.01) and Auxiliary Bishop of Mbujimayi (1998.02.14 – 2009.08.01)

Auxiliary bishop
Bernard Emmanuel Kasanda Mulenga (1999-2009), appointed Bishop here

See also 
 Roman Catholicism in the Democratic Republic of the Congo

Sources and external links
 GCatholic.org, with incumbent biography links
 Catholic Hierarchy

Roman Catholic dioceses in the Democratic Republic of the Congo
Christian organizations established in 1963
Roman Catholic dioceses and prelatures established in the 20th century
Roman Catholic Ecclesiastical Province of Kananga